Actinoceras is the principal and root genus of the Actinoceratidae, a major family in the Actinocerida, that lived during the Middle and Late Ordovician. It is an extinct genus of nautiloid cephalopod that thrived in the warm waters of the United States during the Paleozoic era.

Morphology
Actinoceras are generally large, with typically straight shells reaching a meter or so in length (about 3 ft), with a blunt apex, and usually with a circular to subcircular cross section. .

Shell characteristics
The shells of Actinoceras are generally straight and long, although some are breviconic. Some are fusiform with the diameter decreasing from the anterior end of the phragmocone toward the aperture. Chambers are short and contain cameral deposits which are more concentrated apically and ventrally. Septa are close spaced,  sutures are mostly transverse. The siphuncle, which varies in proportion to the size of the shell among species, is ventral, but not on the ventral margin. (Flower 1957)

Siphucle
The siphuncle, which is ventral of the center but away from the ventral margin, is generally large and composed of segments that are expanded into the chambers, more so than in Ormoceras or Lambeoceras but not as much as in Armenoceras. (Flower 1957) The diameter typically becomes smaller with respect to that of the shell in the forward or anterior part of the phragmocone. Septal necks are long with wide cyrtochoanitic to recumbent brims. Connecting rings are thin.(Teichert 1964)

Canal system
The canal system within the siphuncle in Arctinocers is of the single arc type wherein the radial canals branch off the central canal near the septal openings and sweep back and out, connecting to the parispatium in the preceding segments at their broadest expansion. This type is also found in the derivatives (descendants) of Actinoceras, e.g. Lambeoceras, in some Armenoceras, Nybyoceras, and in Gonioceras. (Flower 1957). The parispatium is a narrow opening or seam that forms between the inside of the connecting rings and the endosiphunclar deposits that grow forward and back from the region of the septal foremina.

Species
About 45 species have been described from North America, including Greenland and the Canadian Arctic with Actinoceras margaretae, A. aequale, and A. gradatum the earliest known, coming from the lower Blackriveran Loweville fm of Ottawa.   Actinoceras concavum from the Ssuyan of southern Manchuria is most similar to Actinoceras centrale from the Chaumont of New York.

Phylogeny
Actinoceras is one of seven known genera in the Family Actinoceratidae.(Teichert 1964)  Actinoceras is thought to have given rise to such genera as Kochoceras and Paractinoceras in the Actinoceratidae and to Lambeoceras of the Lambeoceratidae. The derivation of Actinoceras may be in an early Armenoceras or perhaps from an early Nybyoceras, also part of the  Armenoceratidae.

References
Flower, R,H, 1957, Studies of the Actinoceratida, New Mexico Bureau of Mines and Mineral Resources, Memoir 2. 
Teichert, C, 1964, Actinoceratoidea, in the Treatise on Invertebrate Paleontology, pub Univ of Kansas and the GSA, Vol K, p K190 -

Actinocerida
Prehistoric nautiloid genera
Ordovician cephalopods of North America
Silurian cephalopods of North America
Middle Ordovician first appearances
Silurian extinctions
Paleozoic life of Ontario
Verulam Formation
Paleozoic life of Manitoba
Paleozoic life of Newfoundland and Labrador
Paleozoic life of the Northwest Territories
Paleozoic life of Nunavut
Paleozoic life of Quebec